Gjorgi Kočov, (born 10 November 1984) is a Macedonian professional basketball coach and former player. He currently serves as an assistant coach for Niners Chemnitz which plays in Basketball Bundesliga.

Playing career
Kočov started his professional playing career with KK Rabotnički and later played for other Macedonian teams.

Coaching career
Kočov is a graduated basketball coach earning his degree at the Faculty of Physical Education, Sport and Health on Ss. Cyril and Methodius University in Skopje.

In 2014, he started his coaching career as a head coach for Vardar U-18 and U-20 teams with whom in two seasons he won three gold medals.

In 2016, he was named an assistant coach for the Macedonia national under-16 team. On 27 September 2016, Kočov became the head coach of Vardar. In 2016, Kočov was selected for the best coach in junior competition.

In 2017, he was named the head coach of the Macedonia national under-18 team. On 19 December 2017, he became the assistant coach to Željko Lukajić in MZT Skopje that played in the ABA League.

On 3 April 2018, he became the head coach of MZT Skopje. In 2019, he won the Macedonian League and led the team to the final in the ABA League Second Division. In March 2021, he parted ways with MZT Skopje.

References

External links
 
 

1985 births
Living people
Guards (basketball)
KK MZT Skopje players
KK Rabotnički players
KK Vardar players
Macedonian basketball coaches
Macedonian men's basketball players
Sportspeople from Skopje